Owls Do Cry is a modernist novel by New Zealand author Janet Frame. Published in 1957, the book covers the story of the Withers siblings, who lives in a seaside town in South Island, New Zealand through a period of  20 years. The book extensively covers Daphne Withers' journey, including undergoing lobotomy. Owls Do Cry is the first novel written by Frame and its content is loosely based on Frame's life, particularly her experience of spending eight years in and out of mental asylums, greatly influenced the content of the novel.

References 

1957 novels
1957 debut novels
20th-century New Zealand novels
Modernist novels